Fizkultura i sport (lit. trans.: Physical Culture and Sports) is a Russian publisher of sports books and magazines. It was established in 1923 in the USSR. Its logo depicts the famous sculpture Discobolus by Myron.

Description
"Fizkultura i sport" was the main (though, not exclusive) sports publisher of the USSR. The publisher was a structural part of the State Committee for Publishing Houses, Printing Plants, and the Book Trade by the Council of Ministers of the USSR. It was awarded the Order of the Badge of Honor in 1973. In 1975,  113 books were published with the total circulation of 6.2 million. By 1991 the number of books, published per year, reached 150. After the breakup of the USSR, the amount of publications by the publisher greatly declined. But although today it publishes some 20 books a year, 5 to 10 thousand copies each, there were some signs of the revival in the latest years. Since 1995 the publisher is not under control of the government, it's the joint-stock company.

Books
"Fizkultura i sport" published books and booklets, popularizing sports, textbooks, methodical yearbooks on many sports disciplines, popular and methodic literature (manuals for physical training on one's own, manuals on the preparation to pass GTO tests), books on tourism, fishing, hunting, chess. Since 1972 "Fizkultura i sport" published the yearbook "Panorama of the Sports Year", that apart from articles on famous athletes and sports life of the country, contained results from all major international competitions (such as Olympic Games, World Championships, European Championships) and national competitions (Spartakiads, USSR Championships, etc.), held that year, for all sports, cultivated in the USSR. A lot of books were published on the 1980 Summer Olympics, Friendship Games, Goodwill Games and other major international events.

Literary publications were also one of the main scopes of the publisher. "Relay" sports story collection was published yearly in 1980—1989. There were sports-related anthologies published: 
science fiction anthology "Wizards on the Stadium" (1979). I maghi dello stadio by Gianni Rodari, Sunjammer and The Cruel Sky by Arthur Clarke, The Gods Themselves by Isaac Asimov, Przekładaniec by Stanislaw Lem, Steel by Richard Matheson, etc.
poetry anthology "Olympic Flame. Sports in Works by Poets of the World" (1980). Poems by Ancient Greek poets, by contemporary poets from different countries, etc.
anthology "Whispers in Bedlam" (1982). The Anthem Sprinters by Ray Bradbury, Home is the Hunter by Henry Kuttner, etc.
humorous stories anthology "About Sports with a Smile" (1983). Taming the Bicycle by Mark Twain, etc.
science fiction anthology "Horsehead" Rally (1990). The Menace from Earth by Robert A. Heinlein, etc.

Book series
There were several series of biographical books on famous Soviet athletes and sportspeople, including "Heroes of the Olympic Games", "World Sport Stars", "Hearts, Given Up to Sports". For example, in the latter series, books about Shavarsh Karapetyan, Irina Rodnina and Aleksandr Zaytsev, Alevtina Kolchina and Pavel Kolchin, Vladislav Tretiak, Vsevolod Bobrov, Modestas Paulauskas, Mikhail Yakushin and other notable Soviet athletes were published. Many Soviet book series had logos, the one of "Hearts, Given Up to Sports" series was the Olympic Torch. Besides, its special feature was the motto of the series in Russian, that was present inside each book: "Когда серебряные трубы возвещают победу, они зовут на пьедестал не только победителя, они славят СПОРТ: разум и силу, мужество и волю, верность, отвагу и честь; они славят ЛЮДЕЙ, отдавших сердца спорту, зовущих своими делами, своим примером на жизненный подвиг!" A rough translation into English would be:

Magazines
Apart from books "Fizkultura i sport" published several magazines:

References and footnotes

Great Soviet Encyclopedia

1923 establishments in the Soviet Union
Sport in the Soviet Union
Publishing companies of the Soviet Union
Publishing companies established in 1923